Al-Salman Sport Club is an Iraqi football team based in Al-Muthanna, that plays in Iraq Division Two.

Managerial history

  Mohammed Salih

See also 
 2021–22 Iraq FA Cup

References

External links
 Al-Salman SC on Goalzz.com
 Iraq Clubs- Foundation Dates

1995 establishments in Iraq
Association football clubs established in 1995
Football clubs in Muthanna